Durban Point was a constituency that elected one member to the Parliament of South Africa.

Members 

 Vernon Shearer (1938–1958)
 Vause Raw (1958–1987)

References 

Durban
Former constituencies of South Africa